Auvernier railway station is a railway station in the municipality of Milvignes, in the Swiss canton of Neuchâtel. It is located at the junction of the standard gauge Jura Foot and Neuchâtel–Pontarlier lines of Swiss Federal Railways.

Services
The following services stop at Auvernier:

 Regio:

References

External links 
 
 

Railway stations in the canton of Neuchâtel
Swiss Federal Railways stations